Pasquale De Vita (born 3 March 1994) is an Italian footballer who plays as a forward for Gold Coast Knights.

Career

Atalanta
Born in Naples, Campania, De Vita started his career at Lombard club Atalanta.

Verona
On 17 July 2012, De Vita was signed by Verona in a co-ownership deal, for a peppercorn fee of €500. In June 2013, the co-ownership was renewed. In summer 2013, he was signed by A.C. Pavia. In June 2014, Verona re-acquired De Vita outright.

On 14 August 2014, he was signed by Serie B club Lanciano in a temporary deal. The club also signed Nícolas Andrade and sent Nazareno Battista to opposite direction. On 23 January 2015, De Vita returned to Lega Pro for Monza in a temporary deal.

Trapani
On 19 August 2015, De Vita signed a one-year contract with Trapani, with an option to extend to further season. On 1 February 2016, he moved to Paganese.

Siracusa
In summer 2016, he left for Siracusa. However, on 30 January 2017 he left the club.

AC Libertas
On 23 January 2019, De Vita signed with Sanmarinese club A.C. Libertas.

References

External links
 
 

Italian footballers
Hellas Verona F.C. players
F.C. Pavia players
S.S. Virtus Lanciano 1924 players
A.C. Monza players
Trapani Calcio players
Paganese Calcio 1926 players
Siracusa Calcio players
A.C. Libertas players
Gold Coast Knights F.C. players
Serie C players
Serie B players
National Premier Leagues players
Italy youth international footballers
Footballers from Naples
1994 births
Living people
Association football forwards
Italian expatriate footballers
Expatriate soccer players in Australia
Italian expatriate sportspeople in Australia